This is a list of national airlines currently operating in Portugal.

Scheduled airlines

Charter airlines

See also
 List of defunct airlines of Portugal
 List of airlines
 List of airports in Portugal

References

Portugal
Airlines
Portugal
Airlines